Rhytiphora delicatula is a species of beetle in the family Cerambycidae. It was described by McKeown in 1948.

References

delicatula
Beetles described in 1948